Kevin Johnson may refer to:

Entertainment
Kevin Johnson (singer) (born 1942), Australian singer
Kevin Johnson (ventriloquist) (born 1970), ventriloquist on America's Got Talent
Kevin Royal Johnson (born 1961), American singer-songwriter and author

Fictional characters
The fictional character in the film The Disappearance of Kevin Johnson
Kevin Johnson (Lost) or Michael Dawson, fictional character from Lost

Sports

American football
Kevin Johnson (cornerback) (born 1992), American football cornerback
Kevin Johnson (defensive tackle) (born 1970), American football player
Kevin Johnson (linebacker) (born 1973), Canadian football linebacker
Kevin Johnson (wide receiver) (born 1976), American football wide receiver

Other sports
Kevin Johnson (athlete) (1951-2016), Bahamian sprinter
Kevin Johnson (basketball) (born 1966), American former professional basketball player and former mayor of Sacramento, California
Kevin Johnson (boxer) (born 1979), American heavyweight boxer
Kevin Johnson (footballer) (born 1952), English former footballer
Kevin Johnson (golfer) (born 1967), professional golfer who currently plays on the Nationwide Tour

Others
Kevin Johnson (academic), Dean, University of California, Davis School of Law (King Hall)
Kevin Johnson (mayor) (born 1966), American former mayor of Sacramento, California
Kevin Johnson (executive) (born 1960), former CEO of Starbucks and previous Microsoft executive
Kevin Johnson (venture capitalist) (born 1960)
Kevin L. Johnson (born 1960), member of the South Carolina Senate
Kevin Rashid Johnson (born 1971/72), social activist
Kevin Johnson Jr. (1985–2022), American man executed in Missouri

See also